The Fifteenth Amendment of the Constitution Act 1995 (previously bill no. 15 of 1995) is an amendment of the Constitution of Ireland which removed the constitutional prohibition on divorce, and allowed for the dissolution of a marriage provided specified conditions were satisfied. It was approved by referendum on 24 November 1995 and signed into law on 17 June 1996.

Background
The Constitution of Ireland adopted in 1937 included a constitutional ban on divorce. A previous bill to amend this provision proposed by the Fine Gael–Labour Party government of Garret FitzGerald, the Tenth Amendment of the Constitution Bill 1986, was rejected in a referendum by 63.5% to 36.5%.

In the intervening years, the Judicial Separation and Family Law Reform Act 1989 allowed for legal separation to be recognised by a court. The government made other legislative changes to address the issues identified in that referendum campaign, including the social welfare and pension rights of divorced spouses, which were copper fastened, and the abolition of the status of illegitimacy to remove any distinction between the rights of the children of first and subsequent unions.

Shortly before its collapse, the 1989–92 government published a white paper on marriage breakdown, which proposed "to have a referendum on divorce after a full debate on the complex issues involved and following the enactment of other legislative proposals in the area of family law".

In 1995, the Fine Gael–Labour Party–Democratic Left government of John Bruton proposed a new amendment to allow for divorce in specified circumstances.

Changes to the text
The Fifteenth Amendment deleted the following Article 41.3.2º of the Constitution:

and substituted that subsection with the following:

Oireachtas Debate
The Fifteenth Amendment of the Constitution (No. 2) Bill 1995 was proposed in the Dáil on 27 October 1995 by Minister for Equality and Law Reform Mervyn Taylor. An amendment was proposed by Helen Keogh on behalf of the Progressive Democrats which would have allowed for legislation generally, without the restrictions proposed in the government's proposal:

This amendment was rejected and the Bill passed final stages by the Dáil without division on 11 October. It was passed by the Seanad on 18 October and proceed to a referendum on 24 November 1995.

Campaign
The Catholic Church was strongly against the amendment, but stated that Catholics could vote for the amendment in good conscience, and that it would not be a sin to do so.

Justin Barrett was the spokesman for the Youth Against Divorce campaign. In later years, Barrett himself sought a divorce in 2016.

Result

The '± Yes 1986' column shows the percentage point change in the Yes vote compared to the Tenth Amendment of the Constitution Bill on a similar proposal rejected in a referendum in 1986.

Court challenge
During the referendum, government funds were used to advertise in favour of a 'Yes' vote. One week before the referendum, Patricia McKenna, a Green Party MEP, successfully lodged a complaint against the government with the Supreme Court, and the advertising stopped. This Supreme Court decision led to legislation that would establish a Referendum Commission for each referendum, commencing with the Eighteenth Amendment in 1998.

The returning officer submitted a provisional certificate of the result of the referendum in the High Court as required by the Referendum Act 1994.

According to The Irish Times, "the polls taken at the time showed that, if anything, the end of the advertising campaign coincided with a halt in the slide of support for divorce". Because of the use of Government funds for one side of the campaign, a petition against the result was lodged by Des Hanafin, a Fianna Fáil Senator and chairman of the Pro Life Campaign, which was dismissed by the High Court on 9 February 1996. Hanafin appealed to the Supreme Court, which in June upheld the High Court decision. The High Court then endorsed the provisional certificate on 14 June 1996. President Mary Robinson signed the amendment bill into law three days later.

Subsequent legislation
Before the referendum, a draft Family Law (Divorce) Bill was published to illustrate how the Constitutional provisions would be implemented if the amendment were passed. Once the Constitutional amendment came into force, the divorce bill was introduced in the Oireachtas on 27 June 1996 and signed into law on 27 November 1996. This gave effect in primary legislation to the new Constitutional provisions. Although this act, the Family Law (Divorce) Act, 1996, specified its own commencement date as 27 February 1997, the first divorce was granted on 17 January 1997, based solely on the constitutional amendment, to a dying man who wanted urgently to marry his new partner.

The Thirty-eighth Amendment of the Constitution of Ireland was approved in a referendum held in May 2019, and removed the constitutional requirement for parties to be living apart before a divorce. It also altered the provisions in Article 41.3.3º on the recognition of foreign divorce.

References

Further reading

External links
Fifteenth Amendment of the Constitution Act 1995
Judicial Separation and Family Law Reform Act 1989
Family Law Act 1995
Family Law (Divorce) Act 1996
Full text of the Constitution of Ireland
Oireachtas debates on the Fifteenth Amendment of the Constitution (No. 2) Bill 1995

Marriage, unions and partnerships in Ireland
1995 in Irish law
1996 in Irish law
1995 in Irish politics
1996 in Irish politics
Family law in the Republic of Ireland
15
15
1995 referendums
Amendment, 15
November 1995 events in Europe
Divorce law
Marriage reform
Divorce referendums